The Kendriya Vidyalayas are a network of central government-overseen schools in India, formed under the aegis of the Ministry of Human Resource Development (MHRD), affiliated to the Central Board of Secondary Education (CBSE), headquartered in New Delhi. The functioning of these schools is overseen by the Kendriya Vidyalaya Sangathan which is an autonomous body under India's Ministry of Human Resources and Development.

This is a partial list of Kendriya Vidyalaya schools. The organisation started with 20 regimental schools in 1963 and  there are total of 1,248 schools: 1,245 in India and three abroad. A total of 1,437,363 students  and 48,314 employees were on the rolls . These are divided among 25 regions, each headed by a deputy commissioner.

In India

Andhra Pradesh

 Kendriya Vidyalaya No. 2, Vizag

Arunachal Pradesh

 Kendriya Vidyalaya, Tenga Valley

Assam

Kendriya Vidyalaya, Khanapara

Bihar

Kendriya Vidyalaya Muzaffarpur
Kendriya Vidyalaya Maharajganj

Goa

 K V Bambolim

Haryana

 Kendriya Vidyalaya, Rohtak

Jammu and Kashmir

Kendriya Vidyalaya, Bantalab, Jammu
Kendriya Vidyalaya, Sunjuwan, Jammu

Karnataka

Kendriya Vidyalaya Hebbal, Bangalore
Kendriya Vidyalaya Indian Institute of Science, Bangalore
Kendriya Vidyalaya No. 1, Jalahalli West, Bangalore
Kendriya Vidyalaya No. 2, Jalahalli East, Bangalore
Kendriya Vidyalaya, Malleswaram, Bangalore

Kerala

Kendriya Vidyalaya, Ernakulam
Kendriya Vidyalaya, Kottayam
Kendriya Vidyalaya, Kanjikode
Kendriya Vidyalaya, Kollam
Kendriya Vidyalaya, Malappuram,
Kendriya Vidyalaya, Pattom
Kendriya Vidyalaya, Puranattukara
Kendriya Vidyalaya, Ramavarmapuram

Madhya Pradesh

Kendriya Vidyalaya, Shivpuri, Madhya Pradesh
Kendriya Vidyalaya No. 4, Gwalior
Kendriya Vidyalaya, Rajgarh

Maharashtra

Kendriya Vidyalaya, IIT Powai, Mumbai 
Kendriya Vidyalaya Ganeshkhind, Pune

Odisha

Kendriya Vidyalaya, Charbatia
Kendriya Vidyalaya No. 1, Bhubaneswar
 Kendriya Vidyalaya Rourkela

Tamil Nadu

Kendriya Vidyalaya Karaikudi
Kendriya Vidyalaya Sivaganga

Telangana

 Kendriya Vidyalaya No. 1 AFA, Dundigal 
 Kendriya Vidyalaya No. 2 AFA, Dundigal
 Kendriya Vidyalaya Bolarum

Uttar Pradesh

 Kendriya Vidyalaya, Hardoi
 Kendriya Vidyalaya IIT Kanpur, Kanpur
 Kendriya Vidyalaya, Mati
 Kendriya Vidyalaya, Raebareli
 Kendriya Vidyalaya, Varanasi
 Kendriya Vidyalaya, Dahi Chowki Unnao
 Kendriya Vidyalaya, Ballia

West Bengal

 Kendriya Vidyalaya, Sevoke Road
 Kendriya Vidyalaya, Cossipore, Kolkata
 Kendriya Vidyalaya (AFS), Barrackpore
 Kendriya Vidyalaya No. 1 Kanchrapara

International 
The three Kendriya Vidyalayas outside India are in Kathmandu, Moscow, and Tehran, situated inside Embassies in these countries and their expenditures are borne by the Ministry of External Affairs. They are intended for children of Indian embassy staff and other expatriate employees of the government of India, including State Bank of India.
 Kendriya Vidyalaya, Kathmandu, Nepal
 Kendriya Vidyalaya, Moscow, Russian Federation
 Kendriya Vidyalaya Tehran, Iran

References

 
Kendriya Vidyalaya
 *